Beryl Joan Fletcher (31 May 1938 – 21 February 2018) was a New Zealand feminist novelist. Her first novel, The Word Burners won the 1992 Commonwealth Writers' Prize, Best First Book, Asia/Pacific region.

She graduated from the University of Waikato with a master's degree in Sociology in 1979. She was resident at the University of Iowa, International Writing Program. In 1999, she was Writer in Residence at Waikato University. In 2005, she was a Ledig House International Writers’ Resident. In 2006, she was Writer in Residence at the Randell Cottage.

Works
; Spinifex Press, 2002, 

Juno and Hannah. Spinifex Press. 2013.

Memoir

References

External links
Author's website
Beryl Fletcher interview, The University of Iowa, Nov. 18, 1994 
"Her way", New Zealand Listener, Beryl Fletcher, July 5, 2003

1938 births
2018 deaths
New Zealand women novelists
University of Waikato alumni
20th-century New Zealand novelists
21st-century New Zealand novelists
New Zealand memoirists
Women memoirists
21st-century New Zealand women writers
International Writing Program alumni
20th-century New Zealand women writers